Mallock is a surname. Notable people with the surname include:

Arnulph Mallock (1851–1933), British scientific instrument designer and experimentalist
Michael Mallock (born 1982), English racing driver
Rawlin Mallock (1649-1691), member of the Parliament of England
Richard Mallock (1843-1900), member of the House of Commons
Vivien Mallock (born 1945), English sculptor
William Hurrell Mallock (1849–1923), English novelist and economics writer

See also
Mallock machine, an electrical analog computer built by Rawlyn Richard Manconchy Mallock